Ludvig Ulrich (6 March 1818 – 11 September 1887) was a Swedish military and governor. Between 1868 and 1878 Ulrich was the governor of the Swedish colony of Saint Barthélemy.

From June 1874 to 5 November 1875 he was on leave because of illness, during which time Alarik Helleday was appointed governor. Following the transfer agreement in Paris on 10 August 1877, Ulrich led the determined referendum on the island and then led the surrender ceremony ("La Rétrocession") on 16 March 1878, when the board was handed over to the Governor of Guadeloupe Marie-Gabriel Couturier. On 20 March 1878 Ulrich left the port of Gustavia on the ship Vanadis and returned to Stockholm where he lived in Adolf Fredrik's ward. He died in 1887 and is buried at Galärvarv Cemetery in Stockholm.

References 

1818 births
1887 deaths
Swedish military leaders
Swedish colonial governors of Saint Barthélémy